Cycling in Paris is a common means of transportation, sports, and recreation. The Tour de France, the largest sporting event in cycling, finishes on the Champs-Élysées. Four major recreational cycling routes—EuroVelo 3, Avenue Verte, the Seine à Vélo, and the Veloscenic—pass by Notre-Dame.

Development of cycling in Paris
Nearly disappeared in the 1980s (car traffic was at the time 85 times more important than cycling), cycling has grown since the 1990s.

Cycle ways and routes within Paris 
These include piste cyclable (bike lanes separated from other traffic by physical barriers such as a kerb) and bande cyclable (a bicycle lane denoted by a painted path on the road). Also since 2008,  of specially marked bus lanes are free to be used by cyclists. Cyclists have also been given the right to ride in both directions on certain one-way streets (20 mph zone).

Paris' bike routes are detailed in guides such as Paris de Poche: Cycliste et Piéton (i.e. Pocket Paris: Cyclist and Pedestrian) which costs about €5 or the free Paris à Velo available from Paris town hall offices.

Vélib' 

Following the successful examples of bicycle hire schemes in the French cities of Rennes and Lyon the city of Paris launched a system of rental bikes free service called Vélib' on 15 July 2007. Managed by the company JCDecaux there were originally 10,648 bikes available at 750 Vélib' stations. More than 20,600 bikes at 1,451 stations are planned for late 2007 and Paris may eventually have 50,000 Vélib' bikes for hire.

Vélib's main aim is to replace car use in Paris for short trips.

Paris Respire 

Paris Respire (literally "Paris Breathes") is a car-free scheme where certain roads are closed to vehicular traffic on Sundays and public holidays between the hours of 9am and 5pm. The roads closed include those by the River Seine, in the Marais, the Canal Saint Martin, Montmartre as well as roads elsewhere in the city. Cycling and walking are the main forms of getting around on these roads on these days.

National and international cycle routes

Voies vertes 
Some of the French cycle routes known as Voies vertes (literally "green ways") pass through Paris. One is the Piste du canal de L'Ourcq (the Ourcq canal path) which runs   through Paris to Sevran.

EuroVelo and other international routes 
The long-distance cycle path EuroVelo 3, dubbed the Pilgrim's Route, running between Santiago de Compostela in Spain and Trondheim in Norway passes through Paris.

Other international routes include the Avenue Verte route which runs between Paris and London. The Avenue Verte crosses the English Channel at Dieppe via the Newhaven – Dieppe ferry.

Sports practice 

 

Paris has within its border two tracks where cyclists can practice their activities. The first place is an oval track of 3.6km located around the Longchamp Racecourse in the 16th district and is used by cyclists since the end of the 19th century when appeared the first cycling competitions. Today, the track is the most used segment in France on the sport social media Strava and one of the most popular in the world. 
The second place is called "Polygone de Vincennes" and is located at the Bois de Vincennes in the 12th district of Paris. The track was recently refurbished.

Future developments  
As announced in April 2015, Plan velo up to year 2020 Paris will increase the size of its bike path network or pistes cyclables to   
plus many smaller streets with both way cycling and secure parking at several train stations, total budget is 150m euro

In late spring 2020,  of bike lanes were constructed. These temporary bike lanes are known as coronapiste (corona track) as they were constructed in response to the COVID-19 pandemic. In October 2021, Mayor of Paris Anne Hidalgo announced a new bike plan that will give Paris  of new bike lanes with a goal to make Paris "100% cyclable".

See also 
Transport in Paris
Cyclability
15-minute city
Urban vitality

References

Bibliography

External links 

Paris goes cycling mad | Environment | The Guardian
Freewheeling Paris – Cycling Paris on a Vélib' bike | Travel | The Guardian
 https://web.archive.org/web/20120827134459/http://www.mdb-idf.org/spip/

 
Paris
Transport in Paris